Agenzia Fides is the news agency of the Vatican. It is based in the Palazzo de Propaganda Fide in Vatican City. It is part of the Congregation for the Evangelization of Peoples. It was formed on 5 June 1927, as the first missionary news agency of the Roman Catholic Church and was approved by Pope Pius XI.

History
Agenzia Fides started to issue editions in English, French and Polish (latter for a short period) followed by those in Italian (1929), Spanish (1930), German (1932), Chinese (1998), Portuguese (2002) and Arabic (2008). Since 1998 Fides Service went online with up to five reports daily from non-European events. Its homepage consists of information about statistics and missionaries killed as martyrs.

The image archive of the agency includes about 10,000 photographs documenting the history of Catholic missions from the years 1930 to 1990.

In 2011, the director David Niño de Guzmán was found dead. While the official explanation from investigators pointed to suicide, family, friends and co-workers questioned this finding and believed his death was murder.

The current director is Prof. Luca de Mata.

See also
List of news agencies
Luciano Alimandi

References

External links
 Official website

News agencies based in Vatican City
State media
Organizations established in 1927
1920s establishments in Vatican City